Kathie Sullivan (born May 31, 1953) is an American-born singer who appeared on television's The Lawrence Welk Show from 1976 to 1982.

Biography

Early years
Born in Oshkosh, Wisconsin, Sullivan began singing in church and later at George Nelson Tremper High School in Kenosha, Wisconsin where she sang in the choir and also played cello in the orchestra.

Musical career
She was discovered by Lawrence Welk while attending the University of Wisconsin–Madison, where she was the local Miss Champagne Lady in a show that went on the road. She was hired in 1976 after completing her studies. She sang numerous solos, and often was paired with Dick Dale in various numbers.

As a Christian music artist, she released several Gospel music albums and has performed for charitable originations as World Vision. Kathie also performed in a one-woman show as Jane Long around her home in Dallas, Texas.

Today, she continues to perform, mostly at retirement communities for seniors, and has hosted wraparounds for Welk repeats aired on PBS.

Personal life
Once believed to be romantically involved with Andy Kaufman, with whom she appeared on a 1981 episode of Fridays (the incident was a hoax), she married in 1986 to high school boyfriend Hugh Tollack and is the mother of two daughters.

References 

1953 births
American gospel singers
Living people
Musicians from Kenosha, Wisconsin
People from Oshkosh, Wisconsin
Singers from Wisconsin
University of Wisconsin–Madison alumni